Aechmea miniata is a species of flowering plant in the Bromeliaceae family. This species is native to the state of Bahia in eastern Brazil.

Cultivars
 Aechmea 'Cherokee Maid'

References

miniata
Flora of Brazil
Plants described in 1856
Taxa named by John Gilbert Baker